Solarium (Latin for sundial) was a constellation located between the constellations of Horologium, Dorado and Hydrus. It was introduced in 1822 on the Celestial Atlas of Alexander Jamieson, who substituted it for the constellation Reticulum invented by Nicolas Louis de Lacaille. A decade later it was picked up by Elijah Hinsdale Burritt to whom it is sometimes attributed. It was never popular and is no longer in use.

References

Former constellations